Pope John II (III) of Alexandria, was the 30th Pope of Alexandria & Patriarch of the See of St. Mark.

He is counted as John III by the Eastern Orthodox Church, which acknowledges John Talaia as John I, but as John II by the Copts who reject Talaia. He is sometimes called John Niciota after his birthplace of Nikius.

He was a monk who lived a solitary life in the desert until he was consecrated Pope and Patriarch of Alexandria on 29 May 505.

He was famous for authoring many hagiographical writings and sermons.

He was a contemporary of the Roman Emperor Anastasius I, who favoured the non-Chalcedonian churches, and of Severus of Antioch, the champion of Miaphysitism in Syria. The latter wrote a message to John regarding the nature of Christ, which reads:

John replied with a message that testified to the union of the essence of God, and the trinity of His characters. He also proclaimed that by the incarnation of the eternal Son of God, the Divine and the human nature have become one and no longer two natures, without separation, mingling, or confusion. He anathematized those who separate the two natures, those who confuse them and those who said that the suffering crucified Christ was only a man, and those who say that His Divine nature also suffered and died. He said that the Orthodox faith was to profess that God the word suffered by the flesh that united with.

References

 

|-

|-

Saints from Roman Egypt
516 deaths
6th-century Popes and Patriarchs of Alexandria
6th-century Christian saints
Year of birth unknown
6th-century Byzantine writers